First Person Singular: Pearson – The Memoirs of a Prime Minister was a Canadian biographical television miniseries that aired on CBC Television from 1973 to 1975.

Premise
Bernard Ostry interviewed and former Canadian Prime Minister Lester B. Pearson in this series. Episodes featured this interview footage combined with historic photographs and other film footage of Pearson.

Scheduling
This half-hour series was broadcast on Sundays at 10:00 p.m. (Eastern) from 27 May to 19 August 1973. It was rebroadcast Wednesdays at 10:30 p.m. from 23 October 1974 to 15 January 1975.

Episodes
The series was divided into segments titled as follows:

 27 May 1973: "Childhood and Youth"
 3 June 1973: "The Undergraduate"
 10 June 1973: "To War and Back (1915-1918)"
 17 June 1973: "Crossroads 1919-28"
 24 June 1973: "The Apprentice 1928-39"
 1 July 1973: "Prelude to War 1930-39"
 8 July 1973: "Diplomat at War 1939-1941"
 15 July 1973: "Diplomat at War 1941-1945"
 22 July 1973: "External Affairs 1945-1955"
 29 July 1973: "Suez to the Flag 1956-1965"
 5 August 1973: "Confederation and Conflict" (1963–67)
 12 August 1973: "Friends and Relations (1967-1968)"
 19 August 1973: "Retrospect on Power"

References

External links
 

CBC Television original programming
1973 Canadian television series debuts
1975 Canadian television series endings